The 2018 Philippine Basketball Association (PBA) rookie draft was an event that allowed teams to take turns selecting amateur basketball players and other eligible players, including half-Filipino foreign players. The league determined the drafting order based on the performance of the member teams from the 2017–18 season, with the worst team picking first.

Draft order

The draft order is determined based on the overall performance of the teams from the previous season. The Philippine Cup final ranking comprises 40% of the points, while the rankings of the Commissioner's and Governors' Cups are 30% each.

On draft day, Alaska and Magnolia were playing in the 2018 PBA Governors' Cup Finals. Alaska would've finished either with 3.8 or 3.5 points, in 9th position. Magnolia would've finished with 3.2 or 3.5 points, in 10th position. Magnolia eventually won.

Draft selections

1st round

2nd round

3rd round

4th round

5th round

6th round
A sixth round was held, but both Blackwater and NorthPort passed, thus ending the draft.

Trades involving draft picks

Pre-draft trades
Note: The rights to Barako Bull's draft pick were retained by Phoenix.Prior to the day of the draft, the following trades were made and resulted in exchanges of picks between the teams.

Draft-day trades
No trades were allowed during the draft day as requested by commissioner Willie Marcial.

Draft picks per school

Undrafted players

References

External links
 PBA.ph

Philippine Basketball Association draft
draft
PBA draft